Montesquieu-Avantès is a commune in the Ariège department in southwestern France.

History
 
Montesquieu-Avantès has a significant prehistory in the Pyrenees. The cave-complex was carved out by the Volp River resulting in three extensive caverns: , Trois-Frères and Tuc d'Audoubert. They were discovered by the Begouën children on October 10, 1912.

The caves contain unique works of art. The Salle des Bisons features two masterfully modelled bison, which were sculpted in clay with a stone spatula-like tool 17,000 years ago and show the imprint of the artist's fingers. The pair are among the largest and finest surviving prehistoric sculptures.

Occupied in the Upper Palaeolithic, notably during the Magdalenian Epoch, the caves have been extensively studied. These works on Tuc d'Audoubert were compiled in 2009 in a monograph entitled "The Secret Sanctuary of the Bison".  A subsequent book entitled "The Cave of the Three Brothers" ("La Caverne des Trois-Frères") documents a century of research.  It was published in 2014 on the centenary of its discovery, on July 20, 1914.

These extremely fragile caves are closed to the public for the purposes of preservation.

Montesquieu was a country house founded in 1272 on the initiative of the Comte de Comminges Bernard VI.

Population

See also
Communes of the Ariège department

References

Communes of Ariège (department)
Ariège communes articles needing translation from French Wikipedia